Aphanius apodus is a species of fish in the family Cyprinodontidae. This species is endemic to springs and streams in the Atlas mountains of Algeria, between Batna and Constantine. A. apodus was described as Lebias apodus in 1853 by Paul Gervais with the type locality given as the Springs of Tell, south of Constantine.

Information
It is endemic to Algeria. It is the only Aphanius species which lacks pectoral fins. This species can grow up to the average length of about 45 millimeters or about two inches. The aphanius apodus has the diet of eating small aquatic crustaceans, worms, insect larvae, zooplankton, algae, and occasionally plant material is eaten. If bred for the aquarium, this species can accept dried foods.  Although they will eat dried food, it is better for them to be offered small live or frozen food such as Artemia, Daphnia or bloodworm. There are no recorded threats that could endanger the species into becoming an endangered species. They are known to be found in freshwater.

References

Fish of North Africa
apodus
Endemic fauna of Algeria
Taxonomy articles created by Polbot
Fish described in 1853